Libre is the fifth album by Mexican iconic Rock singer Alejandra Guzmán. It was released in 1993.

"Te Esperaba", the eleventh track on the album, is a song Guzmán dedicated to her daughter, Frida. Guzmán sings about her experience being pregnant with her daughter.

Track listing
 "Mala Hierba"   (C. Sanchez; C. Valle; Marina Lima)
 "Dime Adiós"  (J.R. Florez; Cesar Valle)
 "Mírala, Míralo" (J.R. Florez; Gian Pietro Felisatti)
 "Soy"   (C. Valle; Marina Lima; Sanchez)
 "Calles de Fuego"  (J.R. Florez; C. Valle)
 "Ruge el Corazón"  (C. Valle; Marina Lima; Sanchez)
 "Angeles Caídos"  (J.R. Florez; C. Valle)
 "Hey Tú"  (J.R. Florez; C. Valle)
 "Libre"  (C. Valle; Marina Lima)
 "Cuenta Conmigo" (C. Valle; Marina Lima; Sanchez) 
 "Te Esperaba (Bonus Track)" (J.R. Florez; Gian Pietro Felisatti)

Singles

1993 albums
Alejandra Guzmán albums